Beaulencourt is a commune in the Pas-de-Calais department in the Hauts-de-France region in northern France.

Geography
A small farming village located 20 miles (32 km) south of Arras on the N17 road, at the junction with the D11.  The A1 autoroute passes by just yards from the commune.

Population

Sights
 The church of Notre-Dame, dating from the twentieth century
 The Commonwealth War Graves Commission cemetery.

See also
Communes of the Pas-de-Calais department

References

External links

 The CWGC cemetery

Communes of Pas-de-Calais